Hollingworth is a surname. Notable people with the surname include:

 Al Hollingworth (1918–2005), Canadian lawyer, politician and judge
 Clare Hollingworth (1911–2017), British journalist and author
 Elizabeth Hollingworth, Australian judge in the Supreme Court of Victoria
 Guy Hollingworth (born 1974), English barrister, conjuror, author and lecturer
 Harry Levi Hollingworth (1880–1956), American psychologist
 John Hollingworth (actor), British actor
 John Hollingworth (politician) (born 1930), British politician
 Leta Stetter Hollingworth (1886–1939), American psychologist
 Lewis Hollingworth (1826–1876), English cricketer
 Peter Hollingworth (born 1935), Australian Governor-General and Archbishop

See also
 Hollingsworth
Hollinworth

English-language surnames
Surnames of English origin